Bobby's Burger Palace (BBP) is an upscale group of fast casual restaurants founded by Chef Bobby Flay with a focus on hamburgers, fries, and milkshakes. The first location opened in July 2008 at the Smith Haven Mall in Lake Grove, New York. Most locations closed permanently during the COVID-19 pandemic, and a new fast food variation of the concept was launched in 2021 under the name Bobby's Burgers.

Locations
Most of Bobby's Burger Palace's locations were in New England and the Mid-Atlantic States before the company began expansion outside the area, with locations at the Dadeland Mall in Miami and at the Jack Cincinnati Casino in Ohio which both opened in 2013, and a location on the Las Vegas Strip which opened in 2014.

By 2015, the chain had 19 locations in 10 states and the District of Columbia. It closed an outlet at Long Island's Roosevelt Field in June 2019. The brand's initial Lake Grove location closed in mid 2020 due to the COVID-19 pandemic. Additional closures occurred during the pandemic until only two locations remained as of September 2022, at the Mohegan Sun Casino in Connecticut and Hartsfield–Jackson Atlanta International Airport in Georgia.

Bobby's Burgers 
Bobby Flay opened a fast food variant of the concept called Bobby's Burgers in 2021 initially located in food courts and sports venues. Flay described it as "the next generation of Bobby's Burger Palace, with a fresh identity thanks to new, sleek branding, and a simplified menu featuring our greatest hits." As of September 2022, there are three locations in Las Vegas and one in New York's Yankee Stadium.

See also 
 List of hamburger restaurants

References

External links 
 

Hamburger restaurants in the United States
Companies based in Suffolk County, New York
Restaurant chains in the United States
Fast casual restaurants
2008 establishments in New York (state)
Restaurants established in 2008